Sibley's and James Store Historic District is a national historic district located at Mathews, Mathews County, Virginia. It encompasses two contributing buildings, known variously as the Sibley Brothers General Store (1899), the separately listed Old Thomas James Store (c. 1810), and The Old Store. One of the buildings consists of two sections that were originally two separate buildings, but is now connected to Sibley's by a hyphen.  The Sibley's General Store was constructed in 1899, and is a -story folk Victorian wood-frame building with a full front porch, weatherboard exterior cladding, and wood-shingle decoration at the eaves.  It is connected by a hyphen to a one-story, wood-frame building built about 1840.

It was listed on the National Register of Historic Places in 2010.

References

Commercial buildings on the National Register of Historic Places in Virginia
Historic districts on the National Register of Historic Places in Virginia
Federal architecture in Virginia
Commercial buildings completed in 1810
Buildings and structures in Mathews County, Virginia
National Register of Historic Places in Mathews County, Virginia